General Madariaga Partido is a partido located on the Atlantic coast of Buenos Aires Province in Argentina.

Economy
The economy of General Madariaga Partido is concentrated around agricultural production, although in the summer vacation season (December–February) tourism offers a valuable addition to the economy.

References

External links

 

1907 establishments in Argentina
Partidos of Buenos Aires Province
States and territories established in 1907